Nissan Motor Ibérica S.A. is the Spanish arm of Japanese automaker Nissan that specializes in the sales and distribution of Nissan automobiles in Spain. Until 2021, it also manufactured automobiles and engines. NMI's headquarters are based in the Zona Franca industrial area of the Catalan city of Barcelona. Another of the company's assembly plants is located in Ávila in the Castile and León region. Parts are produced in Montcada i Reixac in the province of Barcelona and manufactured in Los Corrales de Buelna, Cantabria. As of 2010, the number of employees at Nissan Motor Ibérica was 5200. Production was 132,149 vehicles in the record year of 2008. Nissan uses the acronym NMISA for the company.

In May 2020, as part of a global restructuring plan, Nissan announced the closure of its manufacturing operations in Barcelona, resulting in the loss of about 3,000 jobs. The Spanish government has estimated that the plant's closure could cost Nissan more than €1 billion ($1.10 billion). The three Barcelona factories (Zona Franca assembly and engine plant, Montcada i Reixac stamping plant, and Sant Andreu de la Barca rack and suspension plant) closed at the end of December 2021. The last vehicle (a D23 Nissan Navara) was produced the 16th of December, 2021. 3,345,000 vehicles have been produced there.

Assembly plants

Barcelona 

 Nissan Patrol 160/260, Y60, Y61 from 1983 to 2001 (196,000 vehicles produced)
Nissan Vanette
Nissan Serena/Nissan Vanette Cargo/LDV Cub C23
 Nissan Terrano II from 1993 to 2005 (375,000 vehicles produced)/Ford Maverick
 Nissan Primastar/Renault Trafic/Opel/Vauxhall Vivaro A from 2002 to 2014 (732,000 vehicles produced)
 Nissan Navara D40
 Nissan Pathfinder R51
 Nissan NV200 from 2009 to 2019 and e-NV200 from 2014 to 2021 (49,000 e-NV200 produced)
 Nissan Pulsar C13 from 2014 to 2018
 Nissan Navara D23 from July 2015 to December 2021/Renault Alaskan/Mercedes X-Class

Avìla 

 Nissan Atleon
 Nissan Cabstar/Renault Trucks Maxity
 Nissan Trade

References

Car manufacturers of Spain
Manufacturing companies based in Barcelona
Vehicle manufacturing companies established in 1980
Spanish companies established in 1980
Nissan
1980 establishments in Catalonia
Spanish subsidiaries of foreign companies